Entertainer's Basketball Classic is a basketball tournament held at Rucker Park in New York City. It was founded by Greg Marius in 1982. In 1986, the original Rucker Park Tournament became the Entertainers Basketball Classic. Participants of the tournament include NBA professionals such as Allen Iverson, Stephon Marbury, Wilt Chamberlain, Kobe Bryant, Julius Erving, Kyrie Irving, as well NCAA elite players from schools like Syracuse University.

Additionally, entertainers who have attended the event include musician Cam'ron, Jay-Z, Fat Joe Denzel Washington, Bill Clinton, Snoop Dogg, Bill Cosby, and David Stern. The event is often sponsored by companies like Reebok,  MTV, and And1. The MSG, ESPN, and NBA often broadcast games from their channels.

References

External links
 Official website (archived) via Wayback Machine
 Court profile of Rucker Park basketball court
 Photo gallery: Hopefuls Tryout for Rucker Park Basketball Tournament

AND1 
Harlem
Streetball
Basketball competitions in the United States
Recurring sporting events established in 1982
1982 establishments in New York City